Coisa de Acender is a 1992 album of the Brazilian singer and songwriter Djavan released by Sony Music.

Praised by critics and musicians, the album features to be more pop than the previous ones. Among the successes are their first four tracks: "Se..." (one of his biggest hits, scored by the 1990s, with a romantic character, and it was played on the radio in Brazil), "Boa Noite"," "A Rota do Indíviduo" (which was created by Subtitled "ferrugem" after, the partnership with Orlando Morais, packed a style that Djavan was already showing there back in his career) and "Linha do Equador" (recorded by Caetano Veloso in the future).

Track listing

Personnel

Personnel include:

 Djavan: vocals, acoustic guitar, percussion (in "Boa noite" and "Se...") and arrangements
 Torcuato Mariano: electric guitar (in "Boa noite", "Alívio" and "Baile") and acoustic guitar (in "Linha do Equador" and "Violeiros")
 Arthur Maia: bass
 Carlos Bala: drums
 Ronnie Foster: keyboards (in "Boa noite" and "Alívio")
 Paulo Calazans: keyboards (all tracks except "Violeiros")
 Glauton Campello: keyboards (all tracks) and piano
 Marcelo Martins: saxophone, flute and keyboards (in "Alívio")

Special guests:
 Luís Jakha: percussion (in "Boa noite" and "Violeiros")
 Marcos Suzano: percussion (in "Linha do Equador")
 Marco Lobo: percussion (in "Linha do Equador")
 Flávia Virgínia: vocals (in "Boa noite", "Se..." and "Andaluz")
 Be Happy: vocals (in "Boa noite" and "Andaluz")
 Cecília Spyer: vocals (in "Se...")
 Eveline Hecker: vocals (in "Se...")
 Beth Bruno: vocals (in "Se...")
 Kika Tristão: vocals (in "Se...")

Orchestra members (in "A rota do indivíduo (Ferrugem)"):
 Jorge del Barrio: arrangement and conducting
 Endre Granat: violin
 Alex Horvath: violin
 John Scanlon: viola
 Richard Treat: cello

References 

1992 albums
Djavan albums